Sisulu is a surname. People with this surname include:
Albertina Sisulu (1918–2011), anti–apartheid activist
Lindiwe Sisulu (born 1954), South African Minister of Defence and Military Veterans
Max Sisulu  (born 1945), Speaker of the National Assembly of South Africa
Samuel Sisulu (1956-2003), South African anti-apartheid activist, Soweto uprising student leader and founder of South African Freedom Organisation (SAFO)
Walter Sisulu (1912–2003), Secretary-General of the African National Congress
Zwelakhe Sisulu (1950-2012), South African journalist, editor, newspaper founder, CEO of SABC, and businessperson

Xhosa-language surnames